BMC Kirpi (Turkish for "Hedgehog") is a Turkish made Mine-Resistant Ambush Protected vehicle manufactured by BMC. Kirpi  provides significant protection against mine and ballistic threats. It combines standard and add-on armor providing protection against ballistic threats while its V-shape underbody and monocoque allows it to protect the personnel inside from land mines and improvised explosive devices (IEDs).

BMC Kirpi is a heavy armored troop carrier and its primary objective is to transfer personnel from one place to another while protecting them against all kind of threats. However, it can receive different operational roles by being equipped with required mission equipment.

Development 
Kirpi design process started in 2008, first prototype of Kirpi is produced in 2009. BMC has been awarded a tender by 614 units of MRAP vehicles by SSB – Presidency of Defence Industry in 2009. During the preliminary and critical design phases of this 614 Kirpi project, this prototype is further developed and thus becoming Kirpi 1.

Turkish Land Forces have used Kirpi 1 intensively on its operations, and since Kirpi’s are started to be operated, Turkish Land Forces’ casualties started to reduce significantly. After this initial success of Kirpi, its total sales number increased up to more than 1500, with more than 200 for export customers.

After Kirpi 1’s 7 years of service, with the gained experience and feedback received from end users, Kirpi 2 has been introduced in 2018, while having several improvements compared to Kirpi 1. BMC is awarded another contract by SSB in 2018 by 529 units of Kirpi 2 MRAP vehicles. Independent suspension for more comfortable journey for the troops inside, improved air conditioning and engine cooling pack integration, composite add-on armor to lighten the vehicle thus allowing it to carry more payload and thus more mission equipment, particle/shrapnel holder spall liner installation upgrades have been applied to newer second generation of Kirpi 2.

Technical Description 

BMC Kirpi has a monocoque V-shaped body. Recovery and/or towing points are fitted front and rear, a NATO standard pintle being fitted at the rear. A front-mounted hydraulically operated self-recovery winch is standard.

V-shape monocoque body with composed add-on armor offers great resistant against mine and ballistic attacks in terms of NATO Stanag 4569. Protection levels are classified. In second generation of Kirpi, the Kirpi 2 has composite add-on armor and further increased mine protection.

Cabin can carry 13 personnel, driver, commander and gunner facing front, rest of 10 personnel are facing each other, 5 unit on one side, other 5 on another side, seating on the edge of side walls. Each personnel has mine protected seating, gun racks and gun ports to counterfire in times of need. There are two roof hatches, one on front, opens up inside the covered manual turret, optionally manual turret can be replaced with automatic weapon station, in this situation, front roof hatch opens up behind the weapon station, allowing to manually operate or reload. Second roof hatch is at the far end end of cabin. There is a hydraulic operated door at the back of the vehicle, 10 personnel can mount up or evacuate from this door.

BMC Kirpi 4x4 is 18 tons when empty, has 2,000 kg payload with a gross vehicle weight of 20,000 kg

Motive power for the BMC Kirpi is provided by a EURO 3 emissions compliant Cummins diesel engine developing 375 hp (275 kW). An engine cold start kit is fitted and the cooling system has been adapted for tactical applications in between -32°C / +55°C temperatures.

Driveline is completed by an Allison 3000 six-speed fully automatic transmission coupled to an Axletech two-speed transfer box with selectable 4x2 or 4x4 drive. A longitudinal driver-controlled pneumatically operated differential lock is fitted. Both the front steer-drive axle and the rear drive axles are Axletech rated at 9,500 kg capacity and sprung by the combination of parabolic leaf springs, telescopic shock absorbers, and an anti-roll bar. In second generation of Kirpi, the Kirpi 2 has fully independent suspension with coil springs, has same axle capacity. Both are fitted with driver-controlled pneumatically operated cross-axle differential locks. Steering is power assisted.

Single 14.00 R 20 tyres are standard, rims are 10x20”. CTIS is fitted. Disc brakes are fitted front and rear, supplemented by an engine exhaust brake. ABS is also standard.

Automatic fire suppression system inside personnel cabin an engine departments are standard while outside and tire suppression systems are optional.

Variants 

BMC Kirpi is a troop carrier and mainly used to transport troops one place to another safely. It is also a multi-purpose platform that can be adapted for the desired role, needed by the end user. It can be utilized to serve different tactical purposes according to certain requirements. BMC Kirpi has 4x4 and 6x6 configurations. The vehicle is driven from all its available wheels which makes it suitable to perform its duty on any terrain.

4x4 Troop Carrier

Standard troop carrier version is used to transport 13 personnel from one place to another with high safety, ignoring the climate and terrain hardships.

6x6 Troop Carrier

6x6 version of standard troop carrier. Can carry 15 personnel.

Combat Tactical Vehicle

When a standard troop carrier version is equipped with situational awareness & offensive weapon systems makes Kirpi a combat fighting vehicle.

Utility Vehicle

Standard troop carrier version can be turned into a utility vehicle in order to carry cargo safely.

Ambulance

Ambulance version takes wounded soldiers from the heat of battle and safely escorts them to the back of frontlines. Can carry two doctors with two inpatients or two doctors with one inpatient and two walking cases.

Mine Detection and Disposal Vehicle

Leads any military convoy, detects explosives buried underground, disrupts it with its robotic arm and disposes any mine threat.

Characteristics 
The design contract was awarded in 2009, and deliveries commenced in 2014.

Its armored hull provides protection against  armor-piercing rounds and artillery shell splinters. Some vehicles have been fitted with cage armor for protection against RPG rounds.

The Kirpi features shock absorber seats and interior accessories, a GPS system, rear view camera, and automatic fire suppression system. It has five firing ports and four bulletproof windows on each side of the troop compartment.

It has a shielded position for the gunner on top of the roof, which can be operated manually and can rotate through 360 degrees. The vehicle can be armed with a 7.62-mm or 12.7-mm machine gun and is also available with remotely-controlled weapons stations.

Operators 

Kosovo Security Force: Kosovo MoD confirmed the purchase of 14 BMC Kirpi 4x4 MRAP vehicles to local media and Turkish Anadolu Agency news agency, the deliveries are expected to begin in 2022.

 Libyan Army: 18 BMC Kirpi 4x4 MRAP donated by Turkey.
 
Qatari Emiri Land Force: 50 on order
 
 Russian army: one captured from Ukrainian forces.

 Somali National Army: 12 BMC Kirpi 4x4 MRAP vehicles in service. Donated by Turkey.

Tunisian Army: 233 in service.

Turkish Army: over 2000 in service.
Turkish Gendarmerie: 200 in service.

Turkmenistan Army: 100 in service.
  
Ukrainian Navy: Marine detachment of the Ukrainian Naval Forces have received 50 Turkish BMC Kirpi 4x4 MRAP vehicles, 150 more are expected to be delivered later.

Non-state operators
  (AANES)
People's Defense Units (YPG): one captured from the Turkish Army in 2019, seen in use in 2022.

References

External links
 
 Official website
 BMC-350 Kirpi MRAP Mine protected armoured vehicle on armyrecognition.com

Wheeled armoured fighting vehicles
Military vehicles introduced in the 2000s
BMC (Turkey) vehicles
Military vehicles of Turkey